Town and Gown is an outdoor 1991 bronze sculpture by Mark Sponenburgh, installed on the north side of the Willamette University campus in Salem, Oregon, United States.

Description

Town and Gown depicts four people: two academics and two townspeople. The academics wear caps and gowns; the man carries a book and the female holds a branch. The two female townspeople wear capes, dresses, and hats; one carries a purse and the other holds an umbrella. The statues each measure approximately 50 x 18 x 12 inches, and the brick base measures approximately 33 x 80 x 55 inches. A plaque reads: .

History
The sculpture was presented to commemorate the university's sesquicentennial, and was dedicated on February 1, 1992.

Town and Gown was surveyed by the Smithsonian Institution's "Save Outdoor Sculpture!" program in 1993.

See also

 1991 in art

References

1991 sculptures
1992 establishments in Oregon
Bronze sculptures in Oregon
Outdoor sculptures in Salem, Oregon
Sculptures of men in Oregon
Sculptures of women in Oregon
Statues in Oregon
Willamette University campus